Seis am Schlern is an Alpine village in South Tyrol, in the Trentino-Alto Adige/Südtirol region of northern Italy. It is a frazione of the comune of Kastelruth.

Geography
The village lies in the Dolomites, in the shadow of the 2,563m high Schlern. The summit can be reached by following trail number one from the village.

History
The peak at the north west end of the mountain was first climbed in 1888 by Johann Santner. It is named the Santner Spitze in his honour.

Economy
The village is dependent on tourism, in Summer and Winter.

Famous residents
The poet, composer and diplomat Oswald von Wolkenstein lived for a time in Seis. The German philosopher Wilhelm Dilthey died in the village on October 1, 1911.

The Russian scientist, historian and ethnologist Count Aleksey Alekseyevich Bobrinsky died in the Village on December 04, 1938.

References
 Oswald Redlich: Die Traditionsbücher des Hochstifts Brixen vom zehnten bis in das vierzehnte Jahrhundert (= Acta Tirolensia. Vol. 1). Universitätsverlag Wagner, Innsbruck 1886, pp. 3–4, No. 6.

Frazioni of South Tyrol